Warwick Township is a civil township in Benson County, North Dakota, United States.  As of the 2000 census, its population was 78.

References

Townships in Benson County, North Dakota
Townships in North Dakota